There are three locations in Quebec, Canada with the name "Rapides du Cheval Blanc". This article refers to the rapids between the north shore of the Island of Montreal and the south shore of Sainte-Dorothée, Laval.

The Rapides du Cheval Blanc, or White Horse Rapids, flow between the Island of Montreal, Pierrefonds-Roxboro and Sainte-Dorothée, Laval on the Rivière des Prairies in Quebec. The Rapides du Cheval Blanc also include a protected wooded area, a public city park adjacent to the rapids, and to a fault line underneath the area.

History
The name Whitehorse or Cheval Blanc can be traced to several legends. A legend dating to the 18th-century tells of a white horse that would emerge from the Rivière des Prairies to terrorize villagers and ravage crops. Another legend speaks of a horse that was pulling a cart on a ferry across the river to Île Bizard. When the cable connecting the ferry to the shore broke and started to drift downstream, the horse escaped at the rapids. Another legend tells of a white horse that carried the materials for the construction of the Church of Sault-au-Récollet. The horse jumped aboard a boat in the middle of the rapids.

The land being next to the Rivière des Prairies is subject to spring flooding and has flooded many times in the past.

Ownership of the River
The river is owned by both the Federal and Provincial governments. The Federal government, Fisheries and Oceans Canada polices the water, the Provincial polices the earth, the bottom of the river and the north and south shorelines. Floating buoys are placed in the river during the summer to aid boat navigation.

The river cleanliness is usually good according to the RSMA  (Réseau de suivi du milieu aquatique) water testing that is done weekly during warm weather. Rapides du Cheval Blanc is numbered RDP-180.

Ownership of the Land
The original owners of the land were the Algonquin people. 

19th-century historical maps show boundary lines of the farmers fields using the Seigneurial system with names associated to the land. From East to West the names on the Henry Whitmer Hopkins map dating from 1879 are: 
Lot 49 Jos Legault 
Lot 51 M. Lelande (Lalande) 
Lot 52 P. Legault 
Lot 55 N. Lelande (Lalande) Where the public park overlooks the rapids is today. The north end of the street "Riviera".
Lot 62 Jos. Legault
Lot 67 Berthiaume 
Lot 68 Jos. Brunet 
Lot 75 M. Langerin 
Lot 76 Jos. Langerin 
Lot 77 N. Cardinal 
Lot 86 Cardinal 
Lot 87 Richermois 
Lot 92 Jos. Theoret

Aerial photographs of 1947 show that the Cheval Blanc land was agricultural at that time.
When the Deux-Montagnes (original name Canadian Northern Railway) railway was built through the land during the years 1912-18, many fields were cut off from their original parcel of farmland, resulting in triangle shaped properties.

Presently on the undeveloped lots or properties, the Habitant-farmers boundary lines still exist and are visible as 3 feet wide by 3 feet tall stone walls. Many of the farmers' apple trees can still be found in the woods.

Residential development began to replace the farmland in 1953.

The location in the river was officially named in 1968 by the Gouvernement du Québec and Natural Resources Canada.

Rapides du Cheval Blanc Park
The land was being considered as a "Promenade" park as early as 1974.

According to the Gouvernement du Québec and Natural Resources Canada, a public park was created in 1997 on the site of a former sewage treatment plant. The sewage plant was on Lot 67 and Lot 62.

The current nature park, a further expansion of the 1997 park, was finally created in 2009.

On August 8, 2019, the City of Montreal announced a plan to include the Rapides du Cheval Blanc Park into the future Grand Parc de L’Ouest.

There is no official parking lot, there is only normal city street parking for visitors. The exception to this is at the eastern edge of the park where a water pumping station is located. At this location there are four parking spots.

There are no toilets and there is no running tap water.

There are numerous poison ivy plants that may affect children and pets. Warning posts about the ivy have been placed on the grounds.

There can be mosquitoes and other irritating insects in the official park. In summer mosquito season, DEET repellent might be used, to be able to walk the foot trail through the woods in comfort.

After sunset, in the months of June and July, fireflies can be seen in the eastern woods on the fenced bicycle path that is west of 5th Avenue North street.

Deaths
In recent times there have been two deaths at the rapids. On September 16, 2016, the death of Jean Langevin who was 59 years old, and on July 9, 2017, the death of Anoshan Nageswara who was 20 years old.

Wildlife
Wild animals that can be found on the land near the rapids are rabbits, squirrels, snakes, chipmunks, turtles, cardinals, seagulls, sandpipers, herons, ducks, geese, chickadees and finches.

Development
The railway (built in 1916) acted as a barrier to traffic, prevented the easy commercial development of the land. The land was also a designated flood-zone, it often floods in the spring. The river (Rivière des Prairies) water was badly polluted in the past and this also discouraged land development .
 
The city of Montreal has given the Cheval Blanc rapids the designation of RDP 180 and tests the water quality during the summer (RSMA Le Réseau de suivi du milieu aquatique).

See also
List of parks in Montreal

References

External links
Écoterritoire of Cheval Blanc (City of Montreal) (in French) Rapides du Cheval Blanc
The Green coalition website of Cheval Blanc Rapids

Landforms of Laval, Quebec
Landforms of Montreal
Waterfalls of Quebec
Parks in Montreal
Parks in Quebec
Protected areas of Laval, Quebec
Pierrefonds-Roxboro